George Ezekiel Kerr (16 October 1937 – 15 June 2012) was a Jamaican athlete who competed in the 400 and 800 metres. He competed for the British West Indies at the 1960 Summer Olympics, where he won the bronze medal in the 800 metres. He then teamed up with Keith Gardner, Malcolm Spence and James Wedderburn to win the bronze medal in the 4×400 metres relay.

In 1962, he became the first Jamaican athlete to have the national flag flown in recognition of winning a gold when he won double gold in the 400 m and 800 m at the Central American and Caribbean Games held at Kingston's National Stadium. At the 1964 Olympics, representing Jamaica, he finished fourth both in the 800 m and the 4 × 400 m relay. He broke the Olympic record for the 800 m in the semi-finals but lost the bronze by less than one-tenth of a second with 1:45.9, his fastest ever time.

Kerr won five medals at three Commonwealth Games. In 1958 he won a bronze in the 4 × 440 yards relay. He won gold medals in the 440 yards and in the 4 × 440 yards relay and silver in the 880 yards in 1962. His final medal, a bronze for the 880 yards, came in 1966 in Kingston, Jamaica.

On 4 June 2012, Kerr had a heart attack and underwent heart surgery at the University Hospital of the West Indies.  He remained in the intensive care unit until he succumbed to complications. He had a wife, Fay Kerr, five children, Karyn, Margaret, Roger, Candice and William and seven grandchildren.

References

External links
Commonwealth Games results at GBRathletics.com

1937 births
2012 deaths
People from Hanover Parish
Athletes (track and field) at the 1956 Summer Olympics
Athletes (track and field) at the 1958 British Empire and Commonwealth Games
Athletes (track and field) at the 1959 Pan American Games
Athletes (track and field) at the 1960 Summer Olympics
Athletes (track and field) at the 1962 British Empire and Commonwealth Games
Athletes (track and field) at the 1964 Summer Olympics
Athletes (track and field) at the 1966 British Empire and Commonwealth Games
Illinois Fighting Illini men's track and field athletes
Jamaican male sprinters
Jamaican male middle-distance runners
Olympic athletes of Jamaica
Olympic athletes of the British West Indies
Olympic bronze medalists for the British West Indies
Commonwealth Games gold medallists for Jamaica
Commonwealth Games silver medallists for Jamaica
Commonwealth Games bronze medallists for Jamaica
Pan American Games gold medalists for the British West Indies
Pan American Games silver medalists for the British West Indies
Pan American Games medalists in athletics (track and field)
Medalists at the 1960 Summer Olympics
Olympic bronze medalists in athletics (track and field)
Commonwealth Games medallists in athletics
Competitors at the 1962 Central American and Caribbean Games
Central American and Caribbean Games gold medalists for Jamaica
Central American and Caribbean Games medalists in athletics
Medalists at the 1959 Pan American Games
Medallists at the 1958 British Empire and Commonwealth Games
Medallists at the 1962 British Empire and Commonwealth Games
Medallists at the 1966 British Empire and Commonwealth Games